is a Japanese stem cell researcher and a Nobel Prize laureate. He is the former director of Center for iPS Cell (induced Pluripotent Stem Cell) Research and Application and a professor at the Institute for Frontier Medical Sciences at Kyoto University; as a senior investigator at the UCSF-affiliated Gladstone Institutes in San Francisco, California; and as a professor of anatomy at University of California, San Francisco (UCSF). Yamanaka is also a past president of the International Society for Stem Cell Research (ISSCR).

He received the 2010 BBVA Foundation Frontiers of Knowledge Award in the biomedicine category, the 2011 Wolf Prize in Medicine with Rudolf Jaenisch, and the 2012 Millennium Technology Prize together with Linus Torvalds. In 2012, he and John Gurdon were awarded the Nobel Prize for Physiology or Medicine for the discovery that mature cells can be converted to stem cells. In 2013, he was awarded the $3 million Breakthrough Prize in Life Sciences for his work.

Education 
Yamanaka was born in Higashiōsaka, Japan, in 1962. After graduating from Tennōji High School attached to Osaka Kyoiku University, he received his M.D. degree at Kobe University in 1987 and his Ph.D. degree at Osaka City University Graduate School in 1993. After this, he went through a residency in orthopedic surgery at National Osaka Hospital and a postdoctoral fellowship at the J. David Gladstone Institutes of Cardiovascular Disease, San Francisco.

Afterwards, he worked at the Gladstone Institutes in San Francisco, US, and Nara Institute of Science and Technology in Japan. Yamanaka is currently a professor at Kyoto University, where he directs its Center for iPS Research and Application. He is also a senior investigator at the Gladstone Institutes as well as the director of the Center for iPS Cell Research and Application.

Professional career 
Between 1987 and 1989, Yamanaka was a resident in orthopedic surgery at the National Osaka Hospital. His first operation was to remove a benign tumor from his friend Shuichi Hirata, a task he could not complete after one hour when a skilled surgeon would have taken ten minutes or so. Some seniors referred to him as "Jamanaka", a pun on the Japanese word for obstacle.

From 1993 to 1996, he was at the Gladstone Institute of Cardiovascular Disease. Between 1996 and 1999, he was an assistant professor at Osaka City University Medical School, but found himself mostly looking after mice in the laboratory, not doing actual research.

His wife advised him to become a practicing doctor, but instead he applied for a position at the Nara Institute of Science and Technology. He stated that he could and would clarify the characteristics of embryonic stem cells, and this can-do attitude won him the job. From 1999–2003, he was an associate professor there, and started the research that would later win him the 2012 Nobel Prize. He became a full professor and remained at the institute in that position from 2003–2005. Between 2004 and 2010, Yamanaka was a professor at the Institute for Frontier Medical Sciences. Currently, Yamanaka is the director and a professor at the Center for iPS Cell Research and Application at Kyoto University.

In 2006, he and his team generated induced pluripotent stem cells (iPS cells) from adult mouse fibroblasts. iPS cells closely resemble embryonic stem cells, the in vitro equivalent of the part of the blastocyst (the embryo a few days after fertilization) which grows to become the embryo proper. They could show that his iPS cells were pluripotent, i.e. capable of generating all cell lineages of the body. Later he and his team generated iPS cells from human adult fibroblasts, again as the first group to do so.
A key difference from previous attempts by the field was his team's use of multiple transcription factors, instead of transfecting one transcription factor per experiment. They started with 24 transcription factors known to be important in the early embryo, but could in the end reduce it to 4 transcription factors – Sox2, Oct4, Klf4 and c-Myc.

Yamanaka's Nobel Prize–winning research in iPS cells 
The 2012 Nobel Prize in Physiology or Medicine was awarded jointly to Sir John B. Gurdon and Shinya Yamanaka "for the discovery that mature cells can be reprogrammed to become pluripotent."

Background-different cell types 
There are different types of stem cells.  These are some types of cells that will help in understanding the material.

Background-different stem cell techniques

Historical background 
The prevalent view during the early 20th century was that mature cells were permanently locked into the differentiated state and cannot return to a fully immature, pluripotent stem cell state. It was thought that cellular differentiation can only be a unidirectional process. Therefore, non-differentiated egg/early embryo cells can only develop into specialized cells. However, stem cells with limited potency (adult stem cells) remain in bone marrow, intestine, skin etc. to act as a source of cell replacement.

The fact that differentiated cell types had specific patterns of proteins suggested irreversible epigenetic modifications or genetic alterations to be the cause of unidirectional cell differentiation. So, cells progressively become more restricted in the differentiation potential and eventually lose pluripotency.

In 1962, John B. Gurdon demonstrated that the nucleus from a differentiated frog intestinal epithelial cell can generate a fully functional tadpole via transplantation to an enucleated egg. Gurdon used somatic cell nuclear transfer (SCNT) as a method to understand reprogramming and how cells change in specialization. He concluded that differentiated somatic cell nuclei had the potential to revert to pluripotency. This was a paradigm shift at the time. It showed that a differentiated cell nucleus has retained the capacity to successfully revert to an undifferentiated state, with the potential to restart development (pluripotent capacity).

However, the question still remained whether an intact differentiated cell could be fully reprogrammed to become pluripotent.

Yamanaka's research 
Shinya Yamanaka proved that introduction of a small set of transcription factors into a differentiated cell was sufficient to revert the cell to a pluripotent state. 
Yamanaka focused on factors that are important for maintaining pluripotency in embryonic stem (ES) cells. This was the first time an intact differentiated somatic cell could be reprogrammed to become pluripotent. 

Knowing that transcription factors were involved in the maintenance of the pluripotent state, he selected a set of 24 ES cell transcriptional factors as candidates to reinstate pluripotency in somatic cells. First, he collected the 24 candidate factors. When all 24 genes encoding these transcription factors were introduced into skin fibroblasts, few actually generated colonies that were remarkably similar to ES cells.
Secondly, further experiments were conducted with smaller numbers of transcription factors added to identify the key factors, through a very simple and yet sensitive assay system.
Lastly, he identified the four key genes. They found that 4 transcriptional factors (Myc, Oct3/4, Sox2 and Klf4) were sufficient to convert mouse embryonic or adult fibroblasts to pluripotent stem cells (capable of producing teratomas in vivo and contributing to chimeric mice).

These pluripotent cells are called iPS (induced pluripotent stem) cells; they appeared with very low frequency. iPS cells can be selected by inserting the b-geo gene into the Fbx15 locus. The Fbx15 promoter is active in pluripotent stem cells which induce b-geo expression, which in turn gives rise to G418 resistance; this resistance helps us identify the iPS cells in culture.

Moreover, in 2007, Yamanaka and his colleagues found iPS cells with germline transmission (via selecting for Oct4 or Nanog gene). Also in 2007, they were the first to produce human iPS cells.

Some issues that current methods of induced pluripotency face are the very low production rate of iPS cells and the fact that the 4 transcriptional factors are shown to be oncogenic.

In July 2014, during a scandal involving Japanese stem cell researcher Haruko Obokata fabricating data, doctoring images, and plagiarizing the work of others, Yamanaka faced public scrutiny for his associated work lacking full documentation. Yamanaka denied manipulating images in his papers on embryonic mouse stem cells, but he could not find lab notes to confirm that the raw data was consistent with the published results.

Further research and future prospects 
Since the original discovery by Yamanaka, much further research has been done in this field, and many improvements have been made to the technology. Improvements made to Yamanaka's research as well as future prospects of his findings are as follows:

 The delivery mechanism of pluripotency factors has been improved. At first retroviral vectors, that integrate randomly in the genome and cause deregulation of genes that contribute to tumor formation, were used. However, now, non-integrating viruses, stabilised RNAs or proteins, or episomal plasmids (integration-free delivery mechanism) are used.
 Transcription factors required for inducing pluripotency in different cell types have been identified (e.g. neural stem cells).
 Small substitutive molecules were identified, that can substitute for the function of the transcription factors.
 Transdifferentiation experiments were carried out. They tried to change the cell fate without proceeding through a pluripotent state. They were able to systematically identify genes that carry out transdifferentiation using combinations of transcription factors that induce cell fate switches. They found trandifferentiation within germ layer and between germ layers, e.g.,  exocrine cells to endocrine cells, fibroblast cells to myoblast cells, fibroblast cells to cardiomyocyte cells, fibroblast cells to neurons
 Cell replacement therapy with iPS cells is a possibility. Stem cells can replace diseased or lost cells in degenerative disorders and they are less prone to immune rejection. However, there is a danger that it may introduce mutations or other genomic abnormalities that render it unsuitable for cell therapy. So, there are still many challenges, but it is a very exciting and promising research area. Further work is required to guarantee safety for patients.
 Can medically use iPS cells from patients with genetic and other disorders to gain insights into the disease process. 	- Amyotrophic lateral sclerosis (ALS), Rett syndrome, spinal muscular atrophy (SMA), α1-antitrypsin deficiency, familial hypercholesterolemia and glycogen storage disease type 1A.  	- For cardiovascular disease, Timothy syndrome, LEOPARD syndrome, type 1 and 2 long QT syndrome 	- Alzheimer’s, Spinocerebellar ataxia, Huntington’s etc.
 iPS cells provide screening platforms for development and validation of therapeutic compounds. For example, kinetin was a novel compound found in iPS cells from familial dysautonomia and beta blockers & ion channel blockers for long QT syndrome were identified with iPS cells.

Yamanaka's research has "opened a new door and the world's scientists have set forth on a long journey of exploration, hoping to find our cells’ true potential."

In 2013, iPS cells were used to generate a human vascularized and functional liver in mice in Japan. Multiple stem cells were used to differentiate the component parts of the liver, which then self-organized into the complex structure. When placed into a mouse host, the liver vessels connected to the hosts vessels and performed normal liver functions, including breaking down of drugs and liver secretions.

In 2022, Yamanaka factors were shown to effect age related measures in aged mice.

Recognition 
In 2007, Yamanaka was recognized as a "Person Who Mattered" in the Time Person of the Year edition of Time Magazine. Yamanaka was also nominated as a 2008 Time 100 Finalist. In June 2010, Yamanaka was awarded the Kyoto Prize for reprogramming adult skin cells to pluripotential precursors. Yamanaka developed the method as an alternative to embryonic stem cells, thus circumventing an approach in which embryos would be destroyed.

In May 2010, Yamanaka was given "Doctor of Science honorary degree" by Mount Sinai School of Medicine.

In September 2010, he was awarded the Balzan Prize for his work on biology and stem cells.

Yamanaka has been listed as one of the 15 Asian Scientists To Watch by Asian Scientist magazine on May 15, 2011. In June 2011, he was awarded the inaugural McEwen Award for Innovation; he shared the $100,000 prize with Kazutoshi Takahashi, who was the lead author on the paper describing the generation of induced pluripotent stem cells.

In June 2012, he was awarded the Millennium Technology Prize for his work in stem cells. He shared the 1.2 million euro prize with Linus Torvalds, the creator of the Linux kernel. In October 2012, he and fellow stem cell researcher John Gurdon were awarded the Nobel Prize in Physiology or Medicine "for the discovery that mature cells can be reprogrammed to become pluripotent."

 2007 – Osaka Science Prize
 2007 – Inoue Prize for Science
 2007 – Asahi Prize
 2007 – Meyenburg Cancer Research Award
 2008 – Yamazaki-Teiichi Prize in Biological Science & Technology
 2008 – Robert Koch Prize
 2008 – Medals of Honor (Japan) (with purple ribbon)
 2008 – Shaw Prize in Life Science & Medicine
 2008 – Sankyo Takamine Memorial Award
 2008 – Massry Prize from the Keck School of Medicine, University of Southern California
 2008 - Golden Plate Award of the American Academy of Achievement
 2009 – Lewis S. Rosenstiel Award for Distinguished Work in Basic Medical Research
 2009 – Gairdner Foundation International Award
 2009 – Albert Lasker Award for Basic Medical Research
 2010 – Balzan Prize for Stem Cells: Biology and potential applications
 2010 – March of Dimes Prize in Developmental Biology
 2010 – Kyoto Prize in Biotechnology and medical technology
 2010 – Person of Cultural Merit
 2010 – BBVA Foundation Frontiers of Knowledge Award in the Biomedicine Category
 2011 – Albany Medical Center Prize in biomedicine
 2011 – Wolf Prize in Medicine
 2011 – King Faisal International Prize for Medicine
 2011 – McEwen Award for Innovation
 2012 – Millennium Technology Prize
 2012 – Fellow of the National Academy of Sciences
 2012 – Nobel Prize in Physiology or Medicine
 2012 – Order of Culture
 2013 – Breakthrough Prize in Life Sciences
 2013 – Member of the Pontifical Academy of Sciences
 2014 – UCSF 150th Anniversary Alumni Excellence Awards
 2016 – Honorable Emeritus Professor, Hiroshima University

Interest in sports 
Yamanaka practiced judo (2nd Dan black belt) and played rugby as a university student. He also has a history of running marathons. After a 20-year gap, he competed in the inaugural Osaka Marathon in 2011 as a charity runner with a time of 4:29:53. He took part in Kyoto Marathon to raise money for iPS research since 2012. His personal best is 3:25:20 at 2018 Beppu-Ōita Marathon.

See also

 Catherine Verfaillie
 List of Japanese Nobel laureates
 List of Nobel laureates affiliated with Kyoto University

References 
General references:

 
 The Discovery and Future of Induced Pluripotent Stem (iPS)
 Cloning and Stem Cell Discoveries Earn Nobel in Medicine (New York Times, October 8, 2012)

Specific citations:

External links 

 Shinya Yamanaka, Center for iPS Cell Research and Application (CiRA), Kyoto University
 International Society for Stem Cell Research (ISSCR)
 
 
 

1962 births
Living people
Japanese biologists
Japanese Nobel laureates
Academic staff of Kyoto University
People from Higashiōsaka
Cell biologists
Stem cell researchers
Biogerontologists
Wolf Prize in Medicine laureates
Laureates of the Imperial Prize
Nobel laureates in Physiology or Medicine
Foreign associates of the National Academy of Sciences
Members of the French Academy of Sciences
Recipients of the Order of Culture
Recipients of the Albert Lasker Award for Basic Medical Research
Members of the Pontifical Academy of Sciences
Kobe University alumni
Articles containing video clips
Academic staff of Nara Institute of Science and Technology
University of California, San Francisco faculty
University of California, San Francisco alumni
Members of the National Academy of Medicine
Kyoto laureates in Advanced Technology